Major Ronald Owen Lloyd Armstrong-Jones,  (né Jones; 18 May 1899 – 27 January 1966) was a British barrister and soldier. He was the father of Antony Armstrong-Jones, 1st Earl of Snowdon, and father-in-law of Princess Margaret, younger daughter of George VI.

Early life and education
Born Ronald Owen Lloyd Armstrong Jones in Ilford, Essex, he was the only son of Sir Robert Jones, an eminent psychiatrist, and Margaret Roberts, daughter of Sir Owen Roberts. In 1912, his father legally changed the family surname to Armstrong-Jones by deed poll to distinguish himself from another Robert Jones. He was educated at Sandroyd School and Eton. He had two sisters, Elaine Margaret Wauchope (1895–1965) and Gwendolen Jane Buckley (1905–1985), who married Sir Denys Buckley.

Career
During the First World War, Armstrong-Jones was commissioned as a Second Lieutenant into the Royal Regiment of Artillery from 1917–19. After the war, he continued his education at Magdalen College, Oxford. While at Oxford he distinguished himself as a rower, helping the Magdalen crew to win the Grand Challenge Cup at Henley in 1921. He graduated in 1922, then became a barrister at the Inner Temple. In 1936, Armstrong-Jones served as High Sheriff of Caernarvonshire. During the Second World War he returned to the army and served as a Major in the King's Royal Rifle Corps; he was invalided out in 1945, after serving as Deputy Judge Advocate to Montgomery's staff in Normandy and being appointed a Member of the Order of the British Empire in the 1945 New Year Honours in recognition of his service. During the war, his home, Stream House at Henley Park, was requisitioned to the British Army.

He took silk in 1954. The following year, he was appointed a Lord Chancellor's Legal Visitor, whose function is to visit mental patients in hospitals and at home to ensure they are properly cared for and money allocated by the Court of Protection is properly applied and managed for their care. He was a liveryman of the Worshipful Company of Clothworkers and from 1955–59 he was a member of the Industrial Disputes Tribunal. He also served as a Governor of St Bartholomew's Hospital. 

He retired from his post as Legal Visitor in 1963, upon medical advice. The Lord Chancellor's office issued a statement on Armstrong-Jones's retirement: "His doctors have advised him that the constant travelling involved in the duties of the office is likely to be inimical to his health in the future."

Personal life and death
Armstrong-Jones was married three times. Firstly, on 22 July 1925, to Anne Messel (8 February 1902 – July 1992), with whom he had two children: 

Susan (1927–1986), who married John Vesey, 6th Viscount de Vesci
Antony (1930–2017), married to Princess Margaret in 1960 (divorced 1978) and created Earl of Snowdon in 1961 by his sister-in-law, Queen Elizabeth II

Armstrong-Jones' first marriage ended in divorce in 1934, and Anne later married the 6th Earl of Rosse. On 18 June 1936, Armstrong-Jones married secondly Australian Carol Akhurst, daughter of Sir Thomas Melrose Coombe. There were no children from this marriage. They divorced in 1959, and Carol was killed in a car crash in 1966.  

He married thirdly Jenifer Unite Monro on 11 February 1960. Jenifer Unite, an air hostess, was the daughter of Basil Unite, a major fruit importer. They had one son: 

Peregrine John Walter Thomas Owen Llewelyn Armstrong-Jones (born 1960), married Caroline Therese Bloy

Armstrong-Jones underwent an operation in mid-1965 but never recovered from his illness. He returned to the hospital at St Mary's Hospital, Paddington in October 1965, and returned to his home, Plas Dinas, in Caernarfon, before Christmas. He died there in late January, at the age of 66.

References

External links
National Portrait Gallery, London: Owen Lloyd Armstrong-Jones

1899 births
1966 deaths
People educated at Sandroyd School
People educated at Eton College
Royal Artillery officers
King's Royal Rifle Corps officers
British Army personnel of World War I
British Army personnel of World War II
Members of the Order of the British Empire
Alumni of Magdalen College, Oxford
High Sheriffs of Caernarvonshire
Ronald
Welsh barristers
Members of the Middle Temple
Welsh King's Counsel
Military personnel from Essex
English barristers